The Girl in Number 29 is a 1920 American silent drama film directed by John Ford based on the novel The Girl in the Mirror (1919) by Elizabeth Jordan. The film is presumed to be lost.

Plot
As summarized in a film publication, Laurie Devon (Mayo) is a New York playwright who, having had one success, refuses to work on another play. One night he sees a woman (Anderson) in an apartment across the street take out a gun and place it to her forehead. He reaches her in time to save her, and she tells him that she is under some terrible evil influence, which she will not disclose. Devon attempts to untangle the mystery and is led on an adventure. The woman is taken to a house on Long Island, where Devon after a fight rescues her. He takes out the revolver and shoots one of the pursuers, who falls to the ground. On returning home, he is heartbroken and tells his sister Barbara (Fair) and his friends that he is a murderer. His sister and two of his friends then confess that the whole thing was a frame-up, that they had hired some actors to stage everything, and that it was an attempt to get the ambitionless author to write again. The revolver used in the suicide attempt by the woman and in the later shooting had blanks. Devon and the woman from the apartment melt into each other's arms at the final fade-out.

Cast
 Frank Mayo as Laurie Devon
 Elinor Fair as Barbara Devon
 Claire Anderson as Doris Williams
 Robert Bolder as Jacob Epstein
 Ruth Royce as Billie
 Ray Ripley as Ransome Shaw
 Bull Montana as Shaw's Secretary
 Arthur Hoyt as Valet

See also
List of lost films

References

External links

1920 films
1920 drama films
1920 lost films
Silent American drama films
American silent feature films
American black-and-white films
Films directed by John Ford
Lost American films
Films based on American novels
Universal Pictures films
Lost drama films
1920s American films